Lavičky is a municipality and village in Žďár nad Sázavou District in the Vysočina Region of the Czech Republic. It has about 600 inhabitants.

Administrative parts
The village of Závist is an administrative part of Lavičky.

References

Villages in Žďár nad Sázavou District